Leonardo Lorandi (born 20 July 2000) is an Italian racing driver who was the 2018 Italian F4 vice-champion and last competed for JD Motorsport in the 2019 edition of the Formula Renault Eurocup. In 2019 he was part of the Renault Sport Academy.

He is the younger brother of Alessio Lorandi, who is also a racing driver who made it to the FIA Formula 2 Championship.

Racing record

Racing career summary

Complete Italian F4 Championship results
(key) (Races in bold indicate pole position) (Races in italics indicate fastest lap)

Complete Formula Renault Eurocup results
(key) (Races in bold indicate pole position) (Races in italics indicate fastest lap)

References

External links 

 

Living people
2000 births
Italian racing drivers
Italian F4 Championship drivers
Formula Renault Eurocup drivers
ADAC Formula 4 drivers
Euroformula Open Championship drivers
Bhaitech drivers
RP Motorsport drivers
JD Motorsport drivers
Karting World Championship drivers